Hypselodoris violacea is a species of sea slug or dorid nudibranch, a marine gastropod mollusc in the family Chromodorididae.

Distribution
The holotype of this nudibranch was collected at 10 m depth from Magic Reef, Busuanga Island, Palawan, Philippines, . It is known only from Palawan, Philippines and northern Borneo, Malaysia.

Description
Hypselodoris violacea has a deep, dark purple body with a broad solid white border to the mantle. The bulb of the rhinophores is deep purple, with sheaths of the same colour. The gills are also entirely deep purple. There is a tall gill pocket which is also deep purple in colour. This is a large nudibranch, reaching 50 mm in length. This species has been reported as Hypselodoris bullocki.

References

Chromodorididae
Gastropods described in 2018